Miguel Angel Bossio Bastianini (born February 10, 1960 in Montevideo) is a retired football midfielder from Uruguay, who obtained a total number of thirty international caps for his national team. Having made his international debut on October 27, 1983 against Brazil (2–0), he retired from international competition after the 1986 FIFA World Cup.

Bossio played club football for Racing Club de Montevideo, Sud América and Peñarol in Uruguay. In 1986, he joined Valencia in Spain and between 1989 and 1991 he played for Sabadell also in Spain.

He currently  acts as a scout for Valencia.

External links
  Profile

1960 births
Living people
Uruguayan footballers
Uruguayan expatriate footballers
Association football midfielders
Footballers from Montevideo
Uruguayan Primera División players
Racing Club de Montevideo players
Peñarol players
La Liga players
Segunda División players
Valencia CF players
CE Sabadell FC footballers
Albacete Balompié players
Expatriate footballers in Spain
Uruguayan expatriate sportspeople in Spain
Uruguay under-20 international footballers
Uruguay international footballers
1983 Copa América players
1986 FIFA World Cup players
Sud América players
Copa América-winning players